Cosmopterix sichuanella is a moth of the family Cosmopterigidae. It is known from China (Jiangxi, Sichuan).

The length of the forewings is about 4.6 mm.

References

sichuanella